Calathus micropterus is a species of ground beetle from the Platyninae subfamily that can be found everywhere in Europe except for Albania, Andorra, Greece, Hungary, Moldova, Monaco, Portugal, San Marino, Spain, Vatican City, all states of former Yugoslavia (except Croatia and Bosnia and Herzegovina), and various islands.

References

micropterus
Beetles described in 1812
Beetles of Europe